The Nacionalista Party (Filipino and Spanish: Partido Nacionalista) is the oldest political party in both the Philippines and in Southeast Asia in general. It is responsible for leading the country throughout the majority of the 20th century since its founding in 1907; it was the ruling party from 1935 to 1946 (under Presidents Manuel L. Quezon and Sergio Osmeña), 1953–1961 (under Presidents Ramon Magsaysay and Carlos P. Garcia) and 1965–1972 (under President Ferdinand Marcos).

Ideology
The Nacionalista Party was initially created as a Filipino nationalist party that supported Philippine independence until 1946 when the United States granted independence to the country. Since then, many scholarly articles that dealt with the history of political parties during the Third Republic agreed that the party has been increasingly populist, although some argued they had conservative tendencies because of their opposition to the Liberal Party and the Progressive Party. The populist ideology of the party remained to present day as described on their website.

History
The party was organized as a vehicle for Philippine independence, advocating self-rule; and espousing this advocacy through representation in the Philippine Assembly of 1907–1916, and in the succeeding Philippine Legislature of 1916–1935. The ranks of Nationalist politicians rose to prominence through the Commonwealth of the Philippines spanning 1935–1941, ending when political parties were replaced by a singular and monolithic KALIBAPI Party during the Japanese occupation of the Philippines.
 
By the second half of the century, the Nacionalista Party evolved into being main political contenders for leadership in the Philippines, in competition with its rivals, the Liberal Party and the Philippine Progressive Party. This leadership endured until the turbulent suppression of partisan politics during the Ferdinand Marcos regime. In 1978, akin to the Japanese occupation, disparate political parties were coerced to merge into a regime-controlled coalition, the Kilusang Bagong Lipunan. Preferring not to be involved, the Nacionalistas went to hibernation. Years later, in the late 1980s, the party was revived under the leadership of Salvador Laurel until the latter's passing.

The Nacionalista Party is presently led by former Senator Manny Villar. In 2016, the party had fielded three vice-presidential candidates either running independently or in tandem with other political parties, namely Alan Peter Cayetano, Bongbong Marcos and Antonio Trillanes, albeit unsuccessfully.

Controversy over dominant-minority status 

In the 2010 general election, the Nacionalista and the Nationalist People's Coalition (NPC) formed an alliance after it was approved by the Commission on Elections (COMELEC) on April 12, 2010. The Nacionalistas fielded Senator Manuel Villar and running with fellow Senator Loren Legarda who is a member of the NPC. It became the dominant minority party after a resolution passed by the COMELEC. On April 21, 2010, it was blocked by the Supreme Court after a suit filed by the rival Liberal Party. On May 6, 2010, the Supreme Court nullified the merger and therefore giving the Liberal Party to be the dominant minority party. It was based on a resolution by the COMELEC giving political parties to be accredited by August 17, 2009.

The coalition was made to help the Nacionalista Party to help boost the presidential campaign of Senator Villar and have a chance to be the dominant minority party by the COMELEC which give the rights to poll watchers during the canvassing of votes. However, it is being challenged by the Liberal Party calls the said alliance a bogus alliance and they are seeking the same party status by the COMELEC. Several local races are also being challenged from both parties, therefore causing confusion in those races.

Electoral performance

Presidential elections

Vice presidential elections

Legislative elections

Senate

House of Representatives

Notable Nacionalistas

Past

Throughout their careers, many of the country's politicians, statesmen and leaders were in whole or in part Nacionalistas. Notable names include the following:

Presidents
Manuel L. Quezon (2nd President)
José P. Laurel (3rd President)
Sergio Osmeña (4th President)
Manuel Roxas (5th President)
Elpidio Quirino (6th President)
Ramon Magsaysay (7th President)
Carlos P. Garcia (8th President)
Ferdinand Marcos (10th President)
Joseph Estrada (13th President)
Rodrigo Duterte (16th President)
Ferdinand Marcos Jr. (17th President)
Vice Presidents
Fernando Lopez (3rd and 7th vice president under Elpidio Quirino and Ferdinand Marcos)
Emmanuel Pelaez (6th vice president under Diosdado Macapagal)
Salvador Laurel (8th vice president and 5th and last prime minister under President Corazon Aquino)
Senators

Antonio de las Alas
Juan B. Alegre
Alejandro Almendras
Alauya Alonto
Domocao Alonto
Jose Altavas
Magnolia Antonino
Antonio Araneta
Melecio Arranz
José María Arroyo
Benigno Aquino Sr.
José Avelino
Dominador Aytona
Sotero Baluyut
Antonio Belo	
Helena Z. Benitez
Manuel Briones
Nicolas Buendia
Hadji Butu
Tomas Cabili
Aquilino Calvo
Manuel Camus
Nicolás Capistrano	
Alan Peter Cayetano
Edmundo B. Cea
José Clarín
Hermogenes Concepción
Tomás Confesor
Mariano Jesús Cuenco
Alejandro de Guzmán
Bernabé de Guzmán
Ceferino de León
Miriam Defensor-Santiago
Francisco Afan Delgado
Vicente de Vera	
Jose W. Diokno
Ramón Diokno
Francisco Enage	
Juan Ponce Enrile
Rene Espina
Eva Estrada-Kalaw
Rafael Fernandez
Ramon J. Fernandez
Santiago Fonacier
José Fuentebella
Isauro Gabaldón
Juan Gaerlan
Troadio Galicano
Rodolfo Ganzon
Tomás Gómez	
Matías González
Espiridión Guanco	
Mario Guariña	
Pedro Guevara
Pedro C. Hernaez	
Ludovico Hidrosollo	
Domingo Imperial
Leoncio Imperial	
Isaac Lacson	
Wenceslao Lagumbay
Sotero Laurel
José B. Ledesma	
Oscar Ledesma
Roseller T. Lim
Francisco Tongio Liongson
José Locsín
Manuel López	
Joaquin Luna
Alejo Mabanag
Ernesto Maceda
Pacita Madrigal-Warns
Vicente Madrigal
Genaro Magsaysay
Gil Montilla
Ruperto Montinola
Juan Nolasco
Blas Ople
Camilo Osías
José Ozámiz
Rafael Palma
Quintín Paredes
Leonardo Perez
Cipriano Primicias Sr.
Gil Puyat
Vicente Rama
Esteban de la Rama	
Claro M. Recto
Ralph Recto
Isabelo de los Reyes
Francisco Soc Rodrigo
Celestino Rodriguez
Eulogio Rodriguez
Pedro Rodríguez
José E. Romero
Decoroso Rosales
Jose J. Roy
Pedro Sabido
Pastor Salazar	
Lope K. Santos
Prospero E. Sebastian
Esteban Singson	
Balabaran Sinsuat	
Pedro María Sison	
Teófilo Sison
Antero Soriano
Francisco Soriano	
Filemon Sotto
Juan Sumulong
Lorenzo Sumulong
Mamintal A.J. Tamano
Emiliano Tria Tirona
Potenciano Treñas
Antonio Trillanes
Juan Torralba
Arturo Tolentino
Ramon Torres	
Jose Maria Veloso
Jose O. Vera
Juan Villamor	
Francisco Felipe Villanueva
Hermenegildo Villanueva
José Yulo
Mariano Yulo	
Francisco Zulueta	
Jose Zulueta

Others
Roque Ablan Jr. (former Representative of Ilocos Norte's 1st District)
Norberto S. Amoranto (5th Mayor of Quezon City)
Galicano Apacible (former Governor of Batangas)
Benigno Aquino Jr. (former Governor of Tarlac, became Senator under the NP's rival Liberal Party)
Jose Aspiras (former Representative of La Union's 2nd District)
Sergio Bayan (former Mayor of Baguio)
Fortunato Borbon (former Governor of Batangas)
Pablo Borbon (former Governor of Batangas
Bartolome C. Cabangbang (former Representative of Bohol's 2nd district)
Vicente J. Caedo (former Governor of Batangas)
Marc Douglas Cagas IV (former Governor of Davao del Sur)
Antonio Carpio (former Governor of Batangas)
Costancio Castañeda (former Representative of Tarlac's 2nd district)
Modesto Castillo (former Governor of Batangas)
Eduardo Cojuangco Jr. (former Representative of Tarlac's 1st district and Governor of Tarlac)
Pablo Cuneta (former Mayor of Pasay)
 Antonio Diaz (former Representative of Zambales' Lone district)
Vicente Duterte (former Governor of Davao)
Nicolas Gonzales (former Governor of Batangas)
León Guinto- (former Governor of Quezon(Tayabas) and 11th Mayor of Manila)
Eduardo Gullas (former Rrepresentative of Cebu's 1st District and Governor of Cebu)
Maximo Malvar (former Governor of Batangas)
Placido L. Mapa (former Mayor of Baguio)
Ramon P. Mitra Sr. (former Mayor of Baguio)
Isko Moreno (27th Mayor of Manila, was a member of NP during his term as Vice Mayor)
Vicente Noble (former Governor of Batangas)
Juan G. Nolasco (9th Mayor of Manila)
Arsenio Lacson (15th Mayor of Manila)
Luis L. Lardizabal (former Mayor of Baguio)
Jose Laurel Jr. (9th Speaker of the House of Representatives of the Philippines and Representative of Batangas' 3rd district)
Jose C. Laurel IV (former Governor of Batangas)
Feliciano Leviste (former Governor of Batangas)
Elias B. Lopez (former Mayor of Davao City)
Vicente Lukbán (former Governor of Tayabas)
Carmen Planas (former Vice Mayor of Manila)
Miguel Raffiñan (former Representative of Cebu's 6th District and Mayor of Cebu City)
Francisco Remotigue (former Governor of Cebu)
Osmundo Rama (former Governor of Cebu)
Jonvic Remulla (Incumbent Governor of Cavite, was a member of NP during his first term)
Benjamin Romualdez (former Governor of Leyte)
Adelina Santos Rodriguez (6th Mayor of Quezon City)
Isidro Rodriguez (18th Governor of Rizal)
Jose V. Rodriguez (former Representative of Cebu's 7th District and Mayor of Cebu City)
Ignacio Santiago Sr. (former Governor of Bulacan)
Alejo Santos (World War II Veteran, former Representative of Bulacan's 2nd District and former Governor of Bulacan
Isidro Siapno (former Mayor of Baguio)
Chavit Singson (former Governor of Ilocos Sur and Mayor of Narvacan)
Manuel C. Sotto (former Vice Mayor of Davao City
Alfonso Tabora (former Mayor of Baguio)
Nicasio S. Valderossa (former Mayor of Baguio)
Pío Valenzuela (former Governor of Bulacan)
Braulio de Villa (former Governor of Batangas)
Nemesio Yabut (7th Mayor of Makati)
Bienvenido R. Yandoc (former Mayor of Baguio)

Most of these individuals embody solid political traditions of economic and political nationalism are pertinent today, even with the party's subsequent decline.

Current party officials
Some members of the House of Representatives and Senate include—but are not limited to—the following:
Manuel Villar (former Senate President), Party President
Cynthia Villar (current Senator), Party Chairman
Jose Espinosa III (Current Nacionalista Chairman of Iloilo City)
Robert "Ace" Barbers (current Representative from Surigao del Norte), Spokesperson
Mark Aguilar Villar (current Senator)
Imee Marcos (current Senator)
Pia Cayetano (current Senator)
Matthew Marcos Manotoc (current Governor of Ilocos Norte)
Emmylou Taliño-Mendoza (current Governor of Cotabato)
Maria Laarni "Lani" Lopez Cayetano (current Mayor of Taguig)
Deogracias Victor Savellano (current Deputy Speaker of the House of Representatives & Representative from 1st District of Ilocos Sur)
Jose I. Tejada (current Representative from North Cotabato)

Nacionalista-affiliated parties
 PDP–Laban
 Laban ng Demokratikong Pilipino
 Lakas–CMD
 National Unity Party
 United Bangsamoro Justice Party
 People's Reform Party
 Alyansa – Davao del Sur and Davao Occidental
 Alayon – Cebu
 Bileg- Ilocos Sur
 Kugi Uswag Sugbo – Cebu City
 Partido Magdalo – Cavite
 PaDayon Pilipino – Misamis Oriental and Cagayan de Oro
 Paglaum Party- Negros Occidental
 Fuerza Zamboanga – Zamboanga City
 One Batangas – Batangas

Candidates for Philippine general elections

2010

Presidential ticket 
 Manuel Villar – presidential candidate (lost)
 Loren Legarda – vice presidential candidate (lost)

For senator 
 Pia Cayetano (won)
 Bongbong Marcos (won)
 Liza Maza (lost)
 Ramon Mitra III (lost)
 Satur Ocampo (lost)
 Susan Ople (lost)
 Gwen Pimentel (lost)
 Ariel Querubin (lost)
 Gilbert Remulla (lost)
 Adel Tamano (lost)
 Miriam Defensor Santiago (won)

2013

For senator 
All members ran under the administration coalition, Team PNoy.
 Cynthia Villar (won)
 Alan Peter Cayetano (won)
 Antonio Trillanes (won)

2016

For vice president 
Three members ran for vice president albeit as independent candidates. 
 Alan Peter Cayetano (lost)
 Bongbong Marcos (lost)
 Antonio Trillanes (lost)

For senator 
 Susan Ople (guest candidate of United Nationalist Alliance and Partido ng Galing at Puso) (lost)

2019

For senator 
All candidates ran under the administration coalition, Hugpong ng Pagbabago.
Pia Cayetano (won) 
Imee Marcos (won) 
Cynthia Villar (won)

2022

For senator 
Mark Villar (won)

Current members in the 18th Congress

Senate 

 Ralph Recto
 Cynthia Villar
 Imee Marcos
 Pia Cayetano

House of Representatives

District Representatives

 Raneo Abu
 Ma. Lourdes Acosta
 Antonio Albano
 Angelica Amante-Matba
 Sol Aragones
 Angelo Barba
 Robert Ace Barbers
 Breaden John Biron
 Lianda Bolilia
 Juan Pablo Bondoc
 Mercedes Cagas
 Rodolfo Caoagdan
 Alan Peter Cayetano
 Ma. Laarni Cayetano
 Arnulfo "Noli" Celeste
 Joaquin Chipeco, Jr.
 Anthony Peter Crisologo
 Luisa Lloran-Cuaresma
 Eileen Ermita-Buhain
 Jonathan Flores
 Lawrence Fortun
 Jocelyn Fortuno
 Jeanette Loreto-Garin
 Ed Christopher Go
 Michael Gorriceta
 Eduardo Gullas
 Teodorico Haresco
 Romeo Jalosjos, Jr
 Eleandro Madrona
 Dale Gonzalo Malapitan
 Mario Vittorio Mariño
 Corazon Malanyaon
 Jesus Crispin Remulla
 Joselito Sacdalan
 Vilma Santos Recto
 Deogracias Savellano
 Frederick Siao
 Kristine Singson-Meehan
 David Suarez
 Sharee Ann Tan
 Jose Tejada
 Raul Tupas
 Henry S. Oaminal
 Luis Raymund Villafuerte

Partylist allies
 Ronnie Ong (Ang Probinsyano)
 Naealla Rose Bainto-Aguinaldo (Bahay)
 Michael Edgar Aglipay (DIWA)
 Sharon Garin (AAMBIS-OWA)
 Rico Geron (AGAP)
 Irene Gay Saulog (Kalinga)
 Allan Ty (LPGMA)
 Francisco Datol, Jr. (Senior Citizen)

Nacionalista Party presidents

See also
 Filipino nationalism
 List of political parties in the Philippines
 Liberal Party (Philippines)

References

External links
 
 The Jones Act

Conservative parties in the Philippines
Nationalist parties in Asia
Pro-independence parties
Political parties established in 1907
1907 establishments in the Philippines
Centre-right parties
Right-wing populism in Asia
Populist parties
National conservative parties